The women's tournament in ice hockey at the 2022 Winter Olympics was held in Beijing, China between 3 and 17 February 2022. Ten countries qualified for the tournament; six of them did so automatically by virtue of their ranking by the International Ice Hockey Federation, one, China, automatically qualified as hosts, while the three others took part in a qualification tournament.

The United States had been the defending champion. Canada won the gold medal, defeating the United States in the final 3–2. Finland defeated Switzerland 4–0 for the bronze medal. The final standings were an exact repeat of the 2021 IIHF Women's World Championship.

Qualified teams

Format
The ten teams were split into two groups of five teams each, in which they played against each team once. All teams from Group A and the top-three ranked teams from Group B advanced to the quarterfinals. A knockout system was used after the group stage.

Venues

Rosters

Match officials
12 referees and 12 linesmen were selected for the tournament.

Referees
 Cianna Lieffers
 Elizabeth Mantha
 Lacey Senuk
 Anniina Nurmi
 Tijana Haack
 Daria Abrosimova
 Daria Ermak
 Nikoleta Celárová
 Maria Furberg
 Anna Wiegand
 Kelly Cooke
 Chelsea Rapin

Linesmen
 Julia Kainberger
 Alex Clarke
 Justine Todd
 Jenni Heikkinen
 Linnea Sainio
 Lisa Linnek
 Diana Mokhova
 Anna Hammar
 Veronica Lovensnö
 Kendall Hanley
 Jacqueline Spresser
 Sara Strong

Preliminary round
All times are local (UTC+8).

Tiebreak criteria
In each group, teams were ranked according to the following criteria:
Number of points (three points for a regulation-time win, two points for an overtime or shootout win, one point for an overtime or shootout defeat, no points for a regulation-time defeat);
In case two teams are tied on points, the result of their head-to-head match will determine the ranking;
In case three or four teams are tied on points, the following criteria will apply (if, after applying a criterion, only two teams remain tied, the result of their head-to-head match will determine their ranking):
Points obtained in head-to-head matches between the teams concerned;
Goal differential in head-to-head matches between the teams concerned;
Number of goals scored in head-to-head matches between the teams concerned;
If three teams remain tied, result of head-to-head matches between each of the teams concerned and the remaining team in the group (points, goal difference, goals scored);
Place in 2021 IIHF World Ranking.

Group A

Group B

Playoff round

Ranking
Winning teams were reseeded for the semi-finals in accordance with the following ranking:

tier of the group played in
rank within group

Bracket

Quarterfinals

Semifinals

Bronze medal game

Gold medal game

Medalists

Final ranking
The places five to eight are ranked by their preliminary round group and then placement.

Statistics

Scoring leaders
List shows the top ten skaters sorted by points, then goals.

GP = Games played; G = Goals; A = Assists; Pts = Points; +/− = Plus/minus; PIM = Penalties in minutes; POS = Position
Source: IIHF

Leading goaltenders
Only the top five goaltenders, based on save percentage, who have played at least 40% of their team's minutes, are included in this list.

TOI = Time on Ice (minutes:seconds); SA = Shots against; GA = Goals against; GAA = Goals against average; Sv% = Save percentage; SO = Shutouts
Source: IIHF

Awards
The all-star team was announced on 17 February 2022.

References

External links
Ice hockey – women's schedule  at International Olympic Committee
IIHF website

 
Women's tournament
Women's events at the 2022 Winter Olympics
2021–22 in women's ice hockey